William, Willie, Bill, or Billy Gray may refer to:

Arts and entertainment
William S. Gray (film editor) (1896–1946), American film editor
Billy Gray (comedian) (1904–1978), American comedian, comedy club owner, and actor
Billy Gray (actor) (born 1938), American actor who portrayed teenager Bud Anderson on TV's Father Knows Best

Politics and law
William Gray (Massachusetts politician) (1750–1825), American politician and merchant
William Gray (Conservative politician) (1814–1895), British mill owner and Conservative Member of Parliament (MP) for Bolton 1857–1874
William Gray (Canadian politician) (1862–1916), politician in Ontario, Canada
William Gray (Lord Provost) (1928–2000), Lord Provost of Glasgow, 1972–1975
William Gray (New Mexico politician) (born 1940), American state legislator in New Mexico
William B. Gray (1942–1994), American attorney and politician
William Bain Gray, British colonial administrator and civil servant
William H. Gray (Mississippi politician) (1841–1919), Baptist minister and state legislator in Mississippi
William H. Gray (Oregon politician) (1810–1889), American pioneer of Oregon Country
William H. Gray III (1941–2013), American Democrat from Pennsylvania
Wilfred James "Bill" Gray, Australian government official, specialist in Aboriginal matters
William Percival Gray (1912–1992), U.S. federal judge

Religion
William Gray (priest) (1874–1960), Anglican clergyman
William Crane Gray (1835–1919), American religious figure; first bishop of the Episcopal Church's Missionary Jurisdiction
SS William Crane Gray, a Liberty ship
William Henry Gray (1825–1908), Scottish minister

Sports

American football
Bill Gray (offensive lineman) (1922–2011), American offensive lineman for the Washington Redskins
Bill Gray (Canadian football), Canadian football running back
Bill Gray (American football coach), American football and tennis coach

Baseball
Bill Gray (baseball) (1871–1932), American Major League Baseball player, 1890–1898
Dolly Gray (baseball) (William Denton Gray, 1878–1956), American Major League Baseball pitcher for the Washington Senators, 1909–1911
Willie Gray, American baseball player

Other sports
William Gray (jockey), British Champion flat jockey
William Gray (cricketer) (1864–1898), English cricketer
Bill Gray (footballer) (1882–1916), Scottish footballer with Partick Thistle and Southampton in the 1900s
Bill Gray (rugby union), (1932–1993), New Zealand rugby union player
Billy Gray (footballer) (1927–2011), English footballer
Billy Gray (horse trainer) (died 2016), horse trainer

Writing and academics
William Forbes Gray (1874–1950), Scottish journalist and author
William G. Gray (1913–1992), English occultist, author and mystic
William M. Gray (1929–2016), American professor of atmospheric science
William S. Gray (1885–1960), American academic, authority on the teaching of reading

Other fields
William John Gray, 13th Lord Gray (1754–1807), Scottish nobleman and soldier
W. H. Gray (William Henry Gray, 1808–1896), pioneer colonist of South Australia
William Gray (inventor) (1850–1903), American inventor and entrepreneur, inventor of the payphone and the baseball chest protector
William Gray (architect) (1851–1927), American architect
William Gray (RAF officer) (1898–?), First World War flying ace
one of the founders of William Gray & Company, a British shipbuilding company, established in 1863
Bill Gray, co-founder (with his wife) of Bill Gray's, an American chain of fast-food restaurants based in New York State

See also

William Grey (disambiguation)
William Grayson (disambiguation)
Gray (surname)